Calmella is a genus of sea slugs, aeolid nudibranchs, marine gastropod mollusks in the family Flabellinidae.

Species
There are three species within the genus Calmella:
 Calmella bandeli Ev. Marcus, 1976
 Calmella cavolini (Vérany, 1846)
 Calmella gaditana (Cervera, García-Gomez & García, 1987)

Species transferred to other genera:
 Calmella sphaerifera Schmekel, 1965 transferred to genus Piseinotecus as Piseinotecus sphaeriferus (Schmekel, 1965)

References 

Flabellinidae
Gastropod genera